Osman Mahmoud is a Somali sub-clan. Is one of the larger sub-clans within the major Majeerteen Harti confederation of Darod clans. The sub-clan is most notorious for its rich history within Somalia, That of which include sultanates such as the Majeerteen Sultanate

Osman Mahamud's history is not limited to that of the early comings of Somalia, but are still one of the major producers of prominent figures in Somalia today. The sub-clan alone has made for Two Prime Ministers (including the first ever PM of the republic), One President, First President of Somali National Assembly,  Commander of the Somali Police Force  , the Founder of the Somali Youth League, and many others.

The sub-clan has also had some of Somalia's most successful international figures. Osman Mahamud has produced the first ever Somali member and  President of the International Court of Justice (ICJ), the first ever Somali-American lawmaker, Founder of African Development Center and many, many others.

Overview

The Boqorrrooz, or clan-head of the larger branch Mohamud Saleeban. Osman Mahmoud serves as the nominal leader of the Darod clan. 
Some of the most notable members of the Osman Mahmoud are the Majeerteen Sultanate which was based in Baargaal, It was a historical and prominent sultanate in Somalia during its golden age in the mid-19th to early 20th century. Boqor Osman Mahamuud was one of the three prominent rulers of present-day Somalia at the turn of the 20th century.

The Sultanate of Hobyo, Yusuf Ali Kenadid, who ruled over what today is Mudug, and his son, Osman Yuusuf Keenadiid who invented the Osmanya writing script.

Demographics

Distribution and Xarig System 
Due to the size of the Bari/Karkaar region and the large population of Osman Mahamud. There is a Xarig System put in place that signifies every district and the Osman Mahamud sub-clans that settle there.

-Maj.

-Min.

Sultanates and Dynasties

Majeerteen Sultanate 
The Majeerteen Sultanate also known as Majeerteenia or Migiurtinia, was a Somali kingdom centered in the Horn of Africa. Ruled by Boqor Osman Mahamuud (II) during its golden age. The earliest mention of the kingdom is the 16th century.

Before the famous Majeerteen Sultanate there was the Sultanate of Amaanle (Abdirahman Awe) which was overthrown and overtaken by Osman Mahamuud (I) who became the subsequent King and Sultan. It rose to prominence in the 19th century, under the reign of the resourceful Boqor (King) Osman Mahamuud(II). His Sultanate controlled Bari Karkaar, Nugaaal and also central Somalia in the 19th and early 20th centuries.

The polity exerted a strong centralised authority during its existence and possessed all of the organs and trappings of an integrated modern state: a functioning bureaucracy, a hereditary nobility, titled aristocrats, a state flag as well as a professional army. It was another example of the determination of the Migiurtini people to maintain a traditional and free society. The sultanate also maintained written records of their activities, which still exist. It also entered into treaties with foreign powers and exerted strong centralized authority on the domestic front.

The Majeerteen Sultans have styled themselves Boqor of all Darod following the collapse of the Sultanate of Adal in the 16th century.

Sultanate of Hobyo  

The Sultanate of Hobyo, also known as the Sultanate of Obbia was a 19th-century Somali kingdom in present-day northeastern and central Somalia and eastern Ethiopia. It was established in 1870s by Ali Yusuf Kenadid.
Initially, Ali Yusuf Kenadid's goal was to seize control of the neighbouring Majeerteen Sultanate, which was then ruled by his cousin Boqor Osman Mahamud. However, he was unsuccessful in this endeavour, and was eventually forced into exile in Yemen. A decade later, in the 1870s, Kenadid returned from the Arabian Peninsula with a band of Hadhrami musketeers and a group of devoted lieutenants. With their assistance, he managed to overpower the local Habar Gidir clans and establish the kingdom of Hobyo in 1878.

In the late 19th century, all extant Somali monarchs entered into treaties with one of the colonial powers, Abyssinia, Britain or Italy, In late 1888, Sultan Kenadid entered into a treaty with the Italians, making his realm an Italian protectorate. His rival Boqor Osman would sign a similar agreement vis-a-vis his own Sultanate the following year. Both rulers had signed the protectorate treaties to advance their own expansionist objectives, with Kenadid looking to use Italy's support in his dispute with the Omani Sultan of Zanzibar over an area bordering Warsheikh, in addition to his ongoing power struggle over the Majeerteen Sultanate with Boqor Osman. In signing the agreements, the rulers also hoped to exploit the rival objectives of the European imperial powers so as to more effectively assure the continued independence of their territories

Colonial Struggles 

Hersi Boqor was the son of Boqor Osman Mahamuud and the heir apparent to the Sultanate of Migiurtinia. When the Italians announced their intentions to occupy Migiurtinia, Hersi Boqor united the sultanate's forces to rebel against the colonials. Under his leadership, the forces were able to slow the Italian advance which was additionally hurt by a rebellion in the hinterlands of Hobyo that required military attention. For three years the sultanate was in revolt and a number of fierce battles ensued .

Somali Republic

Somali Youth League 
Osman Mahamud have had a lot of involvement with the progression of Somalia. This can be dated back to pre-independence and the formation of the Somali Youth League (SYL).

SYL was the first political party in Somalia. It played a key role in the nation's road to independence during the 1940s, 1950s and 1960s. During the Second World War, Britain occupied Italian Somaliland and militarily administered the territory from 1941 to 1950. Faced with growing Italian political pressure inimical to continued British tenure and Somali aspirations for independence, the Somalis and the British came to see each other as allies. The first modern Somali political party, the Somali Youth Club (SYC), was subsequently established in Mogadishu in 1943. It later became the Somali Youth League.

Yasin Haji Osman Sharmarke, an Osman Mahamuud man, founded the party in 1943.  At its foundation, the party had thirteen founding members that consisted of all the major clans in Somalia, 4 Darood, 3 Hawiye and 3 Rahanweyn,2 Benadiri. All 4 of the Daarod members were Osman Mahamud. As time went on and the party grew in numbers, so did the amount of Osman Mahamuud members. Members such as Abdirashid Ali Sharmarke and Haji Bashir Ismail Yusuf that joined and went on to emerge their ranks.

Executives 
The sub-clan has made for 2 Prime Ministers and 1 President. Abdirashid Ali Sharmarke was Prime Minister of Somali Republic from July 12, 1960, to June 14, 1964, and President of Somali Republic from July 6, 1967, until his assassination on October 15, 1969.

He was also the father of Somali Prime Minister Omar Abdirashid Ali Sharmarke, who was the Prime Minister of Somalia. from 2009 to 2010. He subsequently briefly served as Somalia's Ambassador to the United States in 2014. Sharmarke was re-appointed Prime Minister of Somalia in December 2014. His term ended on 1 March 2017

Somali Police Force and Somali National Army 

The Somali Police Force is the national police force and the main civil law enforcement agency of Somalia.  It served from 1960 to 1991 as one of the principal organs of the Somali Armed Forces and upon reorganisation distanced itself away from the Armed Forces. While organised at a national level, each arm reports to a county police authority, which in turn divides its force by local Police Divisions, headquartered at local police stations; the police force was later reconstituted at the start of the 21st century.

Mohamed Abshir Muse, the first ever Commander of the Somali Police Force, played a big role in progress and influence of the Somali Police Force as he was appointed immediately after Somalia's Independence due to his outstanding resume and past experience. He served the role until the 1969 coup d'état where, after not complying by the coup orders given by General Mohamed Siad Barre, he wound up in jail for over 10 years.

After his release, Musa was one of the founders and leaders of the SSDF rebel group dedicated to ousting the authoritarian regime of Siad Barre. Musa would be the head of the political wing while his colleague and fellow clansmen Abdullahi Yusuf Ahmed would lead the armed wing of the rebel faction.

Musa passed at age 91 in the United States of America on 25 October 2017 in Minneapolis Minnesota

Mohamed Muse Hirsi, commonly known as Adde Muse,  was a former general in the Somali Armed Forces of long-time Somali president Mohamed Siad Barre. Adde Muse, the grandson of Hersi Boqor and great-grandson of Boqor Osman, was one of the first ever Somali graduates of the internationally renowned Modena Military Academy.

From 1963-'65, He served as Secretariat to The Chief of Military Forces. 1965-'67, Chairman of Horseed political party. 1970-'72, Commander of the 21st Division, Somali National Army. 1972 – '73 Chief of Training, Somali Military Forces. Adde later became a local and state governor in northern Somalia before the 1991 outbreak of the Somali Civil War.

He also served as a military attaché to China during the mid to late 1970s. After his stint in China, he later relocated to Canada in 1979.

Mohamed Muse Hirsi passed 8 February 2017 in the UAE. He was 79 years of age.

Siad Barre Regime

President Abdirashid Sharmarke assassination  
On October 15, 1969, while paying a visit to the northern town of Las Anod, Somalia's then President Abdirashid Ali Shermarke was shot dead by a policeman in his security team. His assassination was quickly followed by a military coup d'état on October 21, 1969 (the day after his funeral), in which the Somali Army and police force seized power without encountering armed opposition — essentially a bloodless takeover. The putsch was spearheaded by Major General Mohamed Siad Barre, who at the time commanded the army. For refusing to support Barre's seizure of power, numerous political figures were imprisoned. Among these were General Mohamed Abshir Muse of the Osman Mahmoud and Abdullahi Yusuf Ahmed of Omar Mahmoud. They and many others of political power were imprisoned for several years by the new military regime.

1978 coup d'etat attempt 
The 1978 Somali coup d'état attempt was a violent military coup attempt that took place in Somalia (then Somali Democratic Republic) on 9 April 1978, against the regime of President Siad Barre. The United States Central Intelligence Agency estimated that the coup.

The coup attempt was staged by a group of disgruntled Army officers, led by Colonel Mohamed Osman Irro, in the aftermath of the disastrous Ogaden War against Ethiopia (then ruled by the Mengistu-led Derg). The war was initiated by Siad Barre, who had himself come into power a decade earlier in the 1969 Somali coup d'état.

A United States Central Intelligence Agency (CIA) memorandum written the following month speculated that the coup was in response to Barre ordering the arrest and execution of officers that participated in the Ogaden War. The officers believed that Barre had intentionally used troops from other clans as "cannon fodder" while officers from his own Marehan clan were given safer orders. The report concluded that the officers involved in the c

The coup was launched on 9 April 1978. The bulk of the fighting concluded within the day.

Gunfire broke out at the village of Afgoy, south of the capital Mogadishu, and small-arms fire and explosions were heard on the outskirts of the capital. The coup was originally planned to start in Hargeisa, but Barre likely knew of the attempt in advance and was able to disrupt the coup before it launched, as well as position forces loyal to himself in the capital.

The CIA estimated that the coup involved around 24 officers, 2,000 soldiers, and 65 tanks oup "were motivated at least as much by long-standing ethnic animosities toward Barre as by disenchantment with his regime in the aftermath of the Ogaden debacle".

Following the failed coup, 17 alleged ringleaders were executed. Barre used the coup as justification to purge members of the clans involved in the coup from government and military positions. 12 Majeerteen clansmen were summarily executed by firing squad along with 5 soldiers of other clans including Hawiye, Issaq, and others. Of the Majeerteen soldiers put to death, 5 of them hailed from Omar Mahmoud including Irro, 4 of Osman Mahmoud, 1 Isse Mahmoud and 1 Nuh Jibril.

SSDF 
One of the plotters, Lieutenant Colonel Abdullahi Yusuf Ahmed, escaped to Ethiopia and founded an anti-Siad Barre organization initially called the Somali Salvation Front (SSF; later the Somali Salvation Democratic Front, SSDF), initiating the Somali Rebellion and eventually the Somali Civil War. Somali Salvation Democratic Front, was a political and paramilitary umbrella organization in Somalia. Founded in 1978 by several army officers, it was the first of several opposition groups dedicated to ousting the authoritarian regime of Mohamed Siad Barre.

After the fall of the Barre regime, the SSDF (based largely in northeastern Somalia) was divided in two factions. Mohamed Abshir Musa controlled the political wing while Abdullahi Yusuf Ahmed led the armed wing from 1991 to 1998. There was a brief leadership struggle between the two parties, with Abdullahi Yusuf garnering the support of former military officials and Mohamed Abshir Muse the support from politicians associated with the civilian government of the 1960s.

Puntland

Establishment of the Federal State 
Following the outbreak of the Somali Civil War in 1991, a home-grown constitutional conference was held in Garoowe in 1998 over a period of three months. Attended by the area's political elite, traditional elders (Issims), members of the business community, intellectuals and other civil society representatives, the autonomous Puntland State of Somalia was established to deliver services to the population, offer security, facilitate trade, and interact with domestic and international partners.

Unlike the republic of Somaliland to its west, Puntland is not trying to obtain international recognition as a separate nation. However, both regions have one thing in common: they base their support upon clan elders and their organizational structure along lines based on clan relationships and kinship. However, a key difference was that Puntland was formed as a descendant-based entity unlike in Somaliland. The state was established as a "homeland" for the Harti community of Northern Somalia, whereby the Majeerten were deemed as the "chief architects" of the entity. Since its establishment in 1998, Puntland has also been in territorial disputes with Somaliland over the Sool, Sanaag and Ayn regions.

Jama Ali Jama and Abdullahi Yusuf 
In November 2001, traditional elders elected Jama Ali Jama as the new Puntland President. Jama was a colonel in the Somali National Army prior to the Barre regime and in the mid-70s, promoted to chief ideologue of socialism in the Horn of Africa by the Soviet Union.

Yusuf refused to accept the elders' decision on Jama as president, and in December 2001, he seized by force the town of Garowe, reportedly with Ethiopian support. In early May, Yusuf seized Bosaso and controlled Puntland in general. Forces loyal to Puntland president Jama Ali Jama, led by Adde Muse, withdrew from Bosaso without a fight to avoid the image of conflict between one clan/family in the public eye. Both Yusuf and Jama continued to claim the presidency, and there were continued efforts to resolve the conflict at year's end. A ban on political parties in Puntland remained in place.

President Adde Muse administration 
After Abdullahi Yusuf's second term came to an end, he was succeeded by his vice president Mohamed Hashi who hailed from the Dhulbahante clan. After serving just over two months, Hashi lost his re-election bid to Mohamed Muse Hirsi.

In March 2005, President Muse began an ambitious plan to build an airport in Puntland commercial capital, Bosaso project which is now complete and referred to as Bender Qassim International Airport.

In April 2007, Muse held meetings with Sheikh Saud bin Saqr Al Qasimi, the crown prince and deputy ruler of Ras al-Khaimah in the United Arab Emirates (UAE), where the two leaders signed an agreement on a deal for setting up of a dedicated livestock quarantine facility to facilitate the import of livestock from Somalia to the UAE. In October 2008, Muse also signed a Dh170 million agreement with Dubai's Lootah Group to support the construction of an airport, seaport and free zone in the coastal city of Bosaso. Muse indicated that "I believe that when we finish all these projects our people will benefit by getting good health services, education and overall prosperity.

President Said Abdullahi Dani

International Notability

Clan tree 
There is no clear agreement on the clan and sub-clan structures and many lineages are omitted.

Isse Mahmoud Saleban
Omar Mahmoud Saleban
Osman Mahmoud Saleban
Idris Osman (Bah-Gareen)
Hussein Osman (Bah-Gareen)
Ahmed Osman (Bah-Gareen)
Yusuf Osman
Abdirihiim Yusuf
Dudub Yusuf (Bah-Leelkase)
Dini Yusuf (Bah-Leelkase)
Mohamed Yusuf
Aamir Mohamed
Elmi Mohamed
Ismail Mohamed 
Bah-Libaan-Gashe
Bah-Dir
Yusuf Ismail
Ali Ismail
Bah-Leelkase
Muuse Mohamed
Omar Mohamed
Samatar Omar
Guleed Omar
Yusuf Omar (Bah-Araarsame)
Sultan Ali Omar
Yusuf Sultan
Dalal Sultan
Muse Sultan
Mohamed Sultan
Farah Mohamed
Yusuf Ali
Nur Yusuf (Bah-Isxul)
Muse Yusuf (Bah Isxul)
Samatar Yusuf (Bah-Isxul)
Ugaaryahan Yusuf (Bah-Isxul)
Said Yusuf (Bah-Dubays)
Hassan Yusuf (Bah-Dubays)
Mahamoud Yusuf (Hawadane)
Ugaaryahan Mahamoud (Bah-Dhulbahante)
Liiban Mahamoud (Bah-Dhulbahante)
Cigale Mahamoud (Bah-Dhulbahante)
Hirsi Mahamoud (Bah-Dhulbahante)
Hussein Mahamoud (Bah-Yacquub)
Hassan Mahamoud (Bah-Yacquub)
Shirwac Mahamoud (Bah-Yacquub)
Waceys Mahamoud (Bah-Yacquub)
Nuh Mahmoud (Bah-Yacquub)
Cumar Mahamoud (Bah-Yacquub)
Warfa Mahamoud (Bah-Dir Rooble)
Guled Mahmoud (Bah-Dir Rooble)
Samatar Mahamoud (Bah-Dir Rooble)
Mohamed Mahamoud (Bah-Dir Rooble)

Prominent figures 
Boqor Osman Mahamuud, A Somali king who ruled over the Majeerteen Sultanate and helped it prosper during the 19th century. one of the three prominent rulers of present-day Somalia at the turn of the 20th century
Yasin Haji Osman Sharmarke, Founder and important figure in the Somali Youth League (SYL)
Ilhan Omar, first Somali-American legislator in the US
Abdulqawi Yusuf, President and head judge of the International Court of Justice from 2018 to 2021, but was a part of the court since February 6, 2009
Abdirashid Ali Shermarke, first Prime Minister and second President of Somalia
Jawahir Ahmed, Somali-American Model, winner of Miss Africa Utah pageant representing Somalia
Haji Muuse Boqor, first Minister of Interior and Somalia's president-elect following President Sharmarke's assassination
Hussein Samatar, Somali American politician, banker and community organizer. Founder of African Development Center
Boqor Burhaan Boqor Muuse, the 34th Majerteen king
Mohamed Abshir Muse, First commander of the Somali Police Force
Haji Bashir Ismail Yusuf, First President of Somali National Assembly (1 July 1960), Minister of Health and Labor (1966-1967)
Omar Abdirashid Ali Sharmarke, Prime Minister of Somalia
Mohamud Muse Hersi, former President of Puntland
Yaasiin Cismaan Keenadiid, author of the Somali Dictionary and founding member of the Somali Youth League
Jama Ali Jama, Somali army colonel and former President of Puntland
Faysal Ahmed, Somali Actor, co-starred in hit movie Captain Phillips
Hirsi Magan Isse, scholar, leader of the Somali revolution
Yusuf Ali Kenadid, founder of the Sultanate of Hobyo, one of the three prominent rulers of present-day Somalia at the turn of the 20th century
Ali Yusuf Kenadid, Somali ruler. He was the second Sultan of the Sultanate of Hobyo
Hersi Boqor, anti-colonial leader of Majeerteen Sultanate forces, was heir to his father's throne
Osman Yusuf Kenadid, inventor of the Osmanya writing script
Saida Haji Bashir Ismail, former Finance Vice-Minister in the TNG (2000-2004)
Said Abdullahi Dani, current president of Puntland, former Minister of Planning of Somalia

References

Notes 
The Majeerteen Sultanates 

Majeerteen
Somali clans in Ethiopia